In topology and mathematics in general, the boundary of a subset  of a topological space  is the set of points in the closure of  not belonging to the interior of . The term boundary operation refers to finding or taking the boundary of a set. Some authors (for example Willard, in General Topology) use the term frontier instead of boundary in an attempt to avoid confusion with a different definition used in algebraic topology and the theory of manifolds. Despite widespread acceptance of the meaning of the terms boundary and frontier, they have sometimes been used to refer to other sets. For example, Metric Spaces by E. T. Copson uses the term boundary to refer to Hausdorff's border, which is defined as the intersection of a set with its boundary. Hausdorff also introduced the term residue, which is defined as the intersection of a set with the closure of the border of its complement.

Common definitions 

A  of a set refers to any element of that set's boundary. The boundary  defined above is sometimes called the set's  to distinguish it from other similarly named notions such as the boundary of a manifold with boundary or the boundary of a manifold with corners, to name just a few examples.

Properties 

The closure of a set  equals the union of the set with its boundary: 
 
A set is closed if and only if it contains its boundary, and open if and only if it is disjoint from its boundary. The boundary of a set is closed; this follows from the formula  which expresses  as the intersection of two closed subsets of  

("Trichotomy") Given any subset  each point of  lies in exactly one of the three sets  and   Said differently,  and these three sets are pairwise disjoint. Consequently, if these set are not empty then they form a partition of  

A point  is a boundary point of a set if and only if every neighborhood of  contains at least one point in the set and at least one point not in the set. 
The boundary of the interior of a set as well as the boundary of the closure of a set are both contained in the boundary of the set. 

Conceptual Venn diagram showing the relationships among different points of a subset  of   = set of limit points of   set of boundary points of  area shaded green = set of interior points of  area shaded yellow = set of isolated points of  areas shaded black = empty sets. Isolated points are always boundary points.

Examples

Characterizations and general examples 

A set and its complement have the same boundary:

A set  is a dense open subset of  if and only if  

The interior of the boundary of a closed set is empty. 
Consequently, the interior of the boundary of the closure of a set is empty. 
The interior of the boundary of an open set is also empty. 
Consequently, the interior of the boundary of the interior of a set is empty. 
In particular, if  is a closed or open subset of  then there does not exist any nonempty subset  such that  is open in  
This fact is important for the definition and use of nowhere dense subsets, meager subsets, and Baire spaces. 

A set is the boundary of some open set if and only if it is closed and nowhere dense. 
The boundary of a set is empty if and only if the set is both closed and open (that is, a clopen set).

Concrete examples 

Then

 
 
 
 

These last two examples illustrate the fact that the boundary of a dense set with empty interior is its closure. However, a  subset's boundary always has an empty interior. 

In the space of rational numbers with the usual topology (the subspace topology of ), the boundary of  where  is irrational, is empty.

The boundary of a set is a topological notion and may change if one changes the topology.

Boundary of an open ball vs. its surrounding sphere 

This example demonstrates that the topological boundary of an open ball of radius  is  necessarily equal to the corresponding sphere of radius  (centered at the same point); it also shows that the closure of an open ball of radius  is  necessarily equal to the closed ball of radius  (again centered at the same point). 

which induces on  the usual Euclidean topology. 
Let  denote the union of the -axis  with the unit circle  centered at the origin ; that is,  which is a topological subspace of  whose topology is equal to that induced by the (restriction of) the metric  
Henceforth, unless it clearly indicated otherwise, every open ball, closed ball, and sphere should be assumed to be centered at the origin  and moreover, only the metric space  will be considered (and not its superspace ); this being a path-connected and locally path-connected complete metric space. 

so that when  then 

In particular, the open unit ball's topological boundary  is a  subset of the unit sphere  in  
And the open unit ball's topological closure  is a proper subset of the closed unit ball  in  
The point  for instance, cannot belong to  because there does not exist a sequence in  that converges to it; the same reasoning generalizes to also explain why no point in  outside of the closed sub-interval  belongs to  Because the topological boundary of the set  is always a subset of 's closure, it follows that  must also be a subset of  

always holds. 

Moreover, the unit sphere in  contains  which is an open subset of  This shows, in particular, that the unit sphere  in  contains a  subset of

Boundary of a boundary 

For any set  where  denotes the superset with equality holding if and only if the boundary of  has no interior points, which will be the case for example if  is either closed or open.  Since the boundary of a set is closed,  for any set   The boundary operator thus satisfies a weakened kind of idempotence.

In discussing boundaries of manifolds or simplexes and their simplicial complexes, one often meets the assertion that the boundary of the boundary is always empty.  Indeed, the construction of the singular homology rests critically on this fact.  The explanation for the apparent incongruity is that the topological boundary (the subject of this article) is a slightly different concept from the boundary of a manifold or of a simplicial complex.  For example, the boundary of an open disk viewed as a manifold is empty, as is its topological boundary viewed as a subset of itself, while its topological boundary viewed as a subset of the real plane is the circle surrounding the disk.  Conversely, the boundary of a closed disk viewed as a manifold is the bounding circle, as is its topological boundary viewed as a subset of the real plane, while its topological boundary viewed as a subset of itself is empty.  In particular, the topological boundary depends on the ambient space, while the boundary of a manifold is invariant.

See also 

 See the discussion of boundary in topological manifold for more details.
 
 
 
 
 
 
 , for measure-theoretic characterization and properties of boundary

Notes

Citations

References 

 
 
 

General topology